Balsam Lake is a lake in Itasca County, in the U.S. state of Minnesota.

Balsam Lake was named for the balsam fir trees in its vicinity.

See also
List of lakes in Minnesota

References

Lakes of Minnesota
Lakes of Itasca County, Minnesota